Live Wire is a 2004 live CD/DVD released by Christian rock band Third Day. All of the tracks, except for "Sing a Song" and "Blackbird", are from their album Wire, released earlier that year. "Thank You All" was recorded especially for Live Wire. Some of the songs were cut off the CD but can be found on the DVD. The concert was shot and recorded in Louisville, Kentucky, at the Palace Theater. It has been certified Platinum by the RIAA.

Track listing

CD version
All lyrics by Mac Powell, except for "Wire", by Mark Lee. All music by Mac Powell, Brad Avery, Mark Lee, Tai Anderson & David Carr.

"Rockstar" - 3:28
"Come On Back to Me" - 4:05
"Sing a Song" - 4:03
"I Believe" - 3:00
"It's a Shame" - 4:10
"'Til the Day I Die" - 3:20
"Wire" - 4:41
"Blackbird" - 7:36
"I Got a Feeling" - 4:44
"Thank You All" (Studio) - 3:22

DVD version
"Rockstar"
"Come On Back To Me"
"Sing A Song"
"Consuming Fire"
"You Are So Good To Me"
"I Believe"
"It's A Shame"
"My Hope Is You"
"'Til The Day I Die"
"Blackbird"
"Wire"
"Show Me Your Glory"
"You Are Mine"
"I Got A Feeling"

Awards
The album was nominated for a Dove Award for Long Form Music Video of the Year at the 37th GMA Dove Awards.

References

Third Day albums
2004 live albums
2004 video albums
Live video albums
Reunion Records albums
Christian live video albums
Albums recorded at the Louisville Palace